Many domain names are blocked in the People's Republic of China (mainland China) under the country's Internet censorship policy, which prevents users from accessing certain websites from within the country.

This is a list of the most notable such blocked websites in the country. This page does not apply to Chinese territories that adhere to the policy of one country, two systems (Hong Kong and Macau).

Table of high-ranking websites blocked in mainland China

See also 

 Censorship in China
 Censorship of Wikipedia
 Golden Shield Project
 Internet censorship in China

References

External links
Chinese Firewall Test - Instantly test if a URL is blocked by the Great Firewall of China in real time.  Tests for both symptoms of DNS poisoning and HTTP blocking from a number of locations within mainland China.
China Firewall Test - Test if any domain is DNS poisoned in China in real-time. DNS poisoning is one way in which websites can be blocked. Others are IP blocking and keyword filtering.
China Firewall Test - Test your website from real browsers in China. You can review performance reports and waterfall charts for further analysis and element-by-element performance detail from multiple locations.